Mele is a Comune (Municipality) in the Metropolitan City of Genoa in the Italian region Liguria, located about  west of Genoa.

Mele borders the following municipalities: Genoa, Masone.

References

External links
 Official website

Cities and towns in Liguria